The 2008 Canadian Soccer League season was the 11th since its establishment where a total of 16 teams from Ontario and Quebec took part in the league. The season began on May 16, 2008, and ended on October 26 with the Serbian White Eagles claiming their first championship by defeating Trois-Rivières Attak 2-1 in a penalty shootout. This was the third consecutive year the White Eagles had reached the CSL finals losing respectively to Italia Shooters in 2006, and to rivals Toronto Croatia in 2007. While during the regular season Italia won their second division title with Trois-Rivières becoming the first Quebec team to claim the National Division title.

The CSL added another team to the Peel Region after the relocation of the Canadian Lions to Brampton, Ontario to play as the Brampton Lions in the National Division. Toronto FC of the Major League Soccer established a relationship with the league by entering TFC Academy to the National Division, and TFC Academy II to the Reserve Division. Further significant changes introduced by the league was the creation of the 5 team reserve division in the Toronto region to provide a developmental platform for young players in order to make the transition to the professional ranks. The Ontario Soccer Association reached an agreement with the CSL to receive Operational Independence from the provincial governing body. The league received more coverage from Rogers TV which would broadcast a CSL match on Friday nights.

Changes from 2007 season
  The Canadian Lions of the International Division move to the National Division as the Brampton Lions.
  Portuguese Supra change their name to Portugal FC.
  TFC Academy, the U-18 Academy team of Major League Soccer's Toronto FC, and owned by Maple Leaf Sports & Entertainment, enter the National Division.
  Playoff format adjusted to seed division winners as #1 and #2, and the next top six teams seeded #3-#8 irrespective of division.
  The CSL added a 5 team reserve division involving teams in the Toronto region.
  The Ontario Soccer Association grants the CSL 'Operational Independence' from the provincial governing body.
  Rogers TV agreed to broadcast a CSL game of the week Friday night, reaching 800,000 Toronto homes. The final was broadcast across Ontario to 1.5 million households.

Teams

Final standings

International Division

National Division

2008 scoring leaders
Full article: CSL Golden Boot

CSL 2008 Playoffs

Quarterfinals

Semifinals

CSL Championship

CSL Executive Committee and Staff
A list of the 2008 CSL Executive Committee.

Individual awards

The annual CSL awards were presented before the CSL Championship final on October 26, 2008. All the awards were taken by the National Division teams with the Brampton Lions, North York Astros, and Trois-Rivières Attak receiving the most awards with 2 wins each. Daniel Nascimento of Brampton was chosen by the league as the MVP, and received the Golden Boot. After recording the best defensive record with Trois-Rivières, former Montreal Impact player Andrew Olivieri was named the Goalkeeper of the Year. Trois-Rivières were also recognized with the Fair Play award for being the most disciplined team throughout the season.

The Defender of the Year was given to Carlos Zeballos of North York. After improving his craft in Europe, Rafael Carbajal returned to the North York Astros to achieve the club's highest finish in their  club's history. TFC Academy produced the Rookie of the Year with Adrian Pena. While Isaac Raymond was given the Referee of the Year, and down the road in 2015 was appointed the Manager of Canada's Referee Department for the Canadian Soccer Association.

Reserve Division

In 2008, the league formed the Reserve Division to build a developmental structure within the CSL. The previous time a reserve division was in operation was in the 1990 season in the predecessor league. The intentions of the division was to provide clubs with a supply chain of players with additional playing time, and establish a developmental platform for players in order to make the transition to the professional ranks. The original 5 members of the division were from the Greater Toronto Area with a schedule running from June 2, 2008 to October 6, 2008.

Teams

Final standings

References

External links
 CSL official home page

2008
2008 domestic association football leagues
Canadian Soccer League